Jennifer McMahon  is a New Zealand nurse and nutritionist. From 2012 until November 2018, she was the president of the New Zealand Red Cross Society. In 2018 she was made a Companion of the Royal Society Te Apārangi in recognition of her contributions to health research and to aiding disadvantaged populations worldwide.

Life 
McMahon grew up in Malaysia, Singapore, England and New Zealand. After completing her nursing qualification in Dunedin in 1978, she worked on an Aboriginal reserve in the outback of Australia, and in the Torres Strait Islands and North Queensland. Her first posting with New Zealand Red Cross was in 1983 at a refugee camp on the Thai-Kampuchean (now Cambodian) border. She also served the Red Cross in Angola and was subsequently appointed regional nutritionist for Africa for the International Committee of the Red Cross.

On returning to New Zealand McMahon based herself in Dunedin and serves on the Advisory Committee to the University of Otago’s Centre for International Health and as an executive member of the Otago Medical Research Foundation.

McMahon received an MBE in 1993, the Florence Nightingale Medal in 1991 and an Outstanding Service Medal from New Zealand Red Cross in 1989. In 2006, McMahon completed a Ph.D in human nutrition at the University of Otago.

References

Living people
Year of birth missing (living people)
Companions of the Royal Society of New Zealand
University of Otago alumni
New Zealand Members of the Order of the British Empire
Florence Nightingale Medal recipients
New Zealand nurses
New Zealand women nurses
New Zealand nutritionists